Bozhidar Khristomirov Boyadzhiev (born April 30, 1978 in Kazanlak, Stara Zagora) is an amateur Bulgarian freestyle wrestler, who played for the men's super heavyweight category. Boyadzhiev achieved three top-five finishes for his division at the European Championships (2002 in Baku, Azerbaijan, 2005 in Varna, Bulgaria, and 2006 in Moscow, Russia). He is also a two-time Olympian, and a member of Levski Sofia Wrestling Club in Sofia, under his personal coach Peter Kasabov.

Boyadzhiev made his official debut for the 2004 Summer Olympics in Athens, where he placed second in the preliminary pool of the men's 120 kg class, against Iran's Alireza Rezaei, Mongolia's Gelegjamtsyn Ösökhbayar, and Belarus' Barys Hrynkevich.

At the 2008 Summer Olympics in Beijing, Boyadzhiev competed for the second time in the men's 120 kg class. He lost the qualifying round to Russia's Bakhtiyar Akhmedov, who was able to score two points each in two straight periods, leaving Boyadzhiev without a single point. Because his opponent advanced further into the final match, Boyadzhiev offered another shot for the bronze medal by entering the repechage bouts. Unfortunately, he was defeated in the first round by Iran's Fardin Masoumi, with a technical score of 3–6.

References

External links
Profile – International Wrestling Database
NBC Olympics Profile

Bulgarian male sport wrestlers
1978 births
Living people
Olympic wrestlers of Bulgaria
Wrestlers at the 2004 Summer Olympics
Wrestlers at the 2008 Summer Olympics
People from Kazanlak
20th-century Bulgarian people
21st-century Bulgarian people